The International Journal of Mathematics and Mathematical Sciences is a biweekly peer-reviewed mathematics journal. It was established in 1978 by Lokenath Debnath and is published by the Hindawi Publishing Corporation. 

The journal publishes articles in all areas of mathematics such as pure and applied mathematics, mathematical physics, theoretical mechanics, probability and mathematical statistics, and theoretical biology.

Indexing and abstracting
The journal is or has been indexed and abstracted in the following bibliographic databases:
EBSCO Information Services
Emerging Sources Citation Index
Mathematical Reviews
ProQuest databases
Scopus
Zentralblatt MATH

References

External links

Website prior to 3 March 2001

Publications established in 1978
Mathematics journals
Hindawi Publishing Corporation academic journals
Biweekly journals
English-language journals